The Toyota Corolla WRC is a World Rally Car built for the Toyota Castrol Team by Toyota Motorsport GmbH to compete in the World Rally Championship. It is based upon the E110 version of Toyota Corolla road car. The car was debuted at the 1997 Rally Finland, and replaced the Toyota Celica Turbo ST205. It won a total of four rally victories and the 1999 World Manufacturers' title.

Competition history

The Toyota Corolla WRC (World Rally Car) is special purpose rally car based on the European Corolla 3 door Hatchback (E110), and powered by a modified 3S-GTE engine with water-cooled turbo system producing  and 4WD system copied from the Toyota Celica GT-Four ST205.

It was launched in July 1997, and made its debut at the 1997 Rally Finland with Didier Auriol and Marcus Grönholm behind the wheel.

For 1998 WRC season, double World Rally Champions Carlos Sainz and Luis Moya joined the Toyota Team Europe, and won the 1998 Monte Carlo Rally. It was the first victory for the Corolla WRC.

World Rally Championship results

Championship titles

WRC victories

References

External links

 

All-wheel-drive vehicles
WRC
World Rally Cars
Corolla
World Rally championship-winning cars